Zandobbio is a comune (municipality) in the Province of Bergamo in the Italian region of Lombardy, located about  northeast of Milan and about  east of Bergamo.

Zandobbio borders the following municipalities: Credaro, Entratico, Foresto Sparso, Trescore Balneario, Villongo.

Demographic evolution

References